Lee and Lyn Wilde, sometimes billed as The Wilde Twins, were twin sisters, who appeared in films of the early to mid-1940s.

Early years
Born in East St. Louis, Illinois, Lee is the older of the two, born shortly before midnight of October 10, 1922, with Lyn born in the early hours of the following morning.

They began singing with their siblings in church, and by their teens were singing hymns for their local radio station, as well as performing in Illinois and Kentucky. They graduated from East St. Louis Senior High School in 1939.

Singing
By 1940 they were band singers, and in 1942 they made their film debuts, as vocalists for the Charlie Barnet Band, performing one song in the Harriet Hilliard film Juke Box Jenny. They also performed with Bob Crosby for a short while.

Film
The twins' live performances led to another featured film appearance in the Judy Garland film Presenting Lily Mars in 1942. Joe Pasternak was very impressed by them and signed them to a seven-year contract with Metro-Goldwyn-Mayer studios. They played roles in Andy Hardy's Blonde Trouble (1944), followed by Twice Blessed, a film written specifically to introduce them to a wider audience.

The sisters appeared in nine films together up until 1949. Lyn briefly continued her film career after that, appearing in six more films until 1953.

Personal lives

The twins married brothers, Jim (who married Lyn in 1942) and Tom Cathcart (who married Lee February 22, 1947, in Michigan City, Indiana). They focused their attentions on family life, rather than continuing in show business, but they retained a love of music.

In 1948, Lee was reported to be "seriously ill following a caesarian operation" at Good Samaritan Hospital in Hollywood. She had given birth to a daughter September 28, 1948.

After leaving show business, Lee pursued many activities, including flying. She earned her pilot's license in 1961. She also attended college in Palm Desert, earning an associate degree from College of the Desert, and later graduated with a Bachelor of Arts degree in Foreign Languages from the University of California at Irvine. In 1989, they recorded a reunion album titled Back to Together Once Again and continued to perform occasionally into the 1990s.

Lyn died on September 11, 2016 at the age of 93. Her twin sister Lee predeceased her in 2015.

Filmography

References

External links

Wilde Twins Biography, Lee Wilde Cathcart.

American vocal groups
American women singers
American film actresses
Sibling duos
American twins
Identical twin actresses
People from East St. Louis, Illinois
Actresses from Illinois
Singers from Illinois
Metro-Goldwyn-Mayer contract players